Radebaugh is a surname. Notable people with the surname include:

Alan Paine Radebaugh (born 1952), American artist
Arthur Radebaugh (1906–1974), American illustrator
Barclay Radebaugh (born 1965), American basketball coach
Jani Radebaugh, American planetary scientist
Roy Radebaugh (1881–1945), American baseball player

A place in the United States:
 A community in Hempfield Township, Westmoreland County, Pennsylvania.